The 2009 Toray Pan Pacific Open was a women's tennis tournament played on outdoor hard courts. It was the 26th edition of the Toray Pan Pacific Open, and was part of the Premier Series of the 2009 WTA Tour. It was held at the Ariake Coliseum in Tokyo, Japan, from September 27 through October 2, 2009. Maria Sharapova won the singles title.

Champions

Singles

 Maria Sharapova defeated  Jelena Janković, 5–2 (ret)
 This is Sharapova's first title of the year and 20th of her career. It is her first title since April 2008 in the 2008 Bausch & Lomb Championships and her second win at this event, also winning in 2005.

Doubles

 Alisa Kleybanova /  Francesca Schiavone defeated  Daniela Hantuchová /  Ai Sugiyama, 6–4, 6–2

WTA entrants

Seeds

 seeds are based on the rankings of September 21, 2009

Other entrants
The following players received wildcards into the singles main draw:
  Dinara Safina
  Ai Sugiyama
  Ayumi Morita
  Kimiko Date-Krumm

The following players received entry from the qualifying draw:
  Kateryna Bondarenko
  Anastasia Pavlyuchenkova
  Jill Craybas
  Alexa Glatch
  Andrea Petkovic
  Urszula Radwańska
  Sania Mirza
  Chang Kai-Chen

External links
Official website

 
Toray Pan Pacific Open
2009
Toray Pan Pacific Open, 2009
Toray Pan Pacific Open
Toray Pan Pacific Open
Toray Pan Pacific Open